The Tokyo Frog Kings is a team in the International Swimming League (ISL) established in 2020. The COVID-19 pandemic disrupted the 2020 ISL competition which limited the teams including 2020 expansion teams Tokyo Frog Kings and Toronto Titans to a short competition staged in Budapest, Hungary.

Record
2020 : 6th
2021 :

Swimmer

2021 season

 Bowe Becker
 Richárd Bohus
 Maarten Brzoskowski
 Ivan Girev
 Tomoru Honda
 Takeshi Kawamoto
 Yasuhiro Koseki
 Vladimir Morozov
 Nandor Nemeth
 Daniil Pasynkov 
 Alessandro Pinzuti
 Federico Poggio
 Cristian Quintero
 Daiya Seto
 Pedro Spajari
 Zac Stubblety-Cook
 Grigoriy Tarasevich

 Tomomi Aoki
 Mallory Comerford
 Catherine DeLoof
 Gabby DeLoof
 Suzuka Hasegawa
 Chihiro Igarashi
 Leah Gingrich
 Harriet Jones
 Keanna MacInnes
 Paige Madden
 Julie Meynen
 Yui Ohashi
 Leah Smith
 Aly Tetzloff
 Miranda Tucker
 Kanako Watanabe
 Cassie Wild

2020 season
 Bruno Fratus
 Kosuke Hagino
 Ryosuke Irie
 Yuki Kobori
 Kosuke Matsui
 Katsuhiro Matsumoto
 Naoki Mizunuma
 Shoma Sato
 Shinri Shioura
 Brad Tandy
 Markus Thormeyer
 Reona Aoki
 Runa Imai
 Simona Kubová
 Anna Ntountounaki
 Natsumi Sakai
 Aya Sato
 Sakiko Shimizu
 Rio Shirai
 Ai Soma
 Miho Teramura

References

International Swimming League
2020 establishments in Japan